Renfro Valley Barn Dance was an American country music stage and radio show originally carried by WLW-AM in Cincinnati, Ohio on Saturday nights. It debuted on October 9, 1937 from the Cincinnati Music Hall and moved to the Memorial Auditorium in Dayton, Ohio. It was hosted by John Lair, Red Foley, Cotton Foley, and Whitey Ford.

The show later moved to larger quarters near Mt. Vernon, Kentucky in November 1939 and was carried by WHAS-AM in Louisville, the NBC Radio Network and WCKY-AM in Cincinnati.

The program is no longer broadcast, but a live show bearing its name takes place on Saturday nights at the Renfro Valley Entertainment Center in Renfro Valley, Kentucky. A sister program, the Renfro Valley Gatherin' (established in 1943), continues to air.

PBS did a documentary series on American Roots Music called "In the Valley Where Time Stands Still", which is a film about the history of the Renfro Valley Barn Dance.

Performers

See also
Renfro Valley Gatherin'

References

 Hillbilly-Music.com

External links
 Renfro Valley Barn Dance website

American country music radio programs